The International Foundation for Art Research (IFAR) is a non-profit organization which was established to channel and coordinate scholarly and technical information about works of art. IFAR provides an administrative and legal framework within which experts can express their objective opinions.  This data is made available to individuals, associations and government agencies.

 IFAR functions as a step towards more regularized attribution protocols in which the question is not the importance of the attribution but the correctness of it.
 IFAR is actively involved in the legal, ethical, and educational issues surrounding the ownership and theft of art.

History
IFAR was initially conceived in New York in 1969; its first president was Houston industrialist John de Ménil.

Founding members of the privately funded foundation were:
 Harry Bober, New York University, Institute of Fine Arts
 Jose Lopez-Rey, NYU Institute of Fine Arts
 Lewis Goldenberg, Wildenstein & Co, New York
 Peregrine Pollen, Park-Bernet Galleries, New York
 John Rewald, University of Chicago
 Joseph Rothman, New York Attorney General, art frauds

The first Advisory council members were:
 Diego Angulo Íñiguez, Prado Museum, Madrid
 Francois Daulte, Bibliotheque des Arts, Lausanne
 Charles Durand-Ruel, Durand-Ruel Galleries, Paris
 Lloyd Goodrich, Whitney Museum, New York City
 Daniel-Henry Kahnweiler, Galerie Louise Leiris, Paris
 Lawrence Majiewski, Conservation Center, NYU Institute of Fine Arts

In 1989, IFAR had become "a very grand-sounding name for what is really just three smart, dedicated, underpaid women who are among the nation's leading experts on stolen and forged art." Constance Lowenthal, Margaret I. O'Brien and Virgilia H. Pancoast work in an Upper East Side office which contains 30,000 files documenting stolen art cases. The three-rooms were on the fourth floor of the Explorers Club, on East 70th Street.

Database
IFAR compiled information about stolen art; and by 1990, IFAR was updating its catalogue of stolen art 10 times a year.   In 1991, IFAR helped to establish the Art Loss Register (ALR) as a commercial enterprise. IFAR managed ALR's U.S. operations through 1997. In 1998, ALR assumed full responsibility for the database although IFAR retains ownership.

Development
In response to the growth and development of IFAR, museum officials have revised some policies based on an assumption that discussing theft would scare away potential donors.  The change from policies of secrecy to ones which emphasize openness was gradual, mirroring an expectation that publicizing theft is likely to promote recovery.

Selected timeline

 1998: The World Jewish Congress  established the Commission for Art Recovery (CAR) to recover art taken from Jewish collectors before and during World War II.  Constance Lowenthal, then executive director of the IFAR, was selected as its initial executive director.
 1997: The United States Holocaust Memorial Museum in Washington started the Holocaust Art Restitution Project (HARP) in order to document and publish Jewish artwork which still remains missing.  HARP developed and maintains an archive and database for families who have lost works and want to find them. HARP will not seek recover art.
 1990: Artworks stolen from the Isabella Stewart Gardner Museum in Boston include Vermeer's Concert, three Rembrandts and five works by Degas.
 1989: IFAR received reports of about 5,000 thefts.

See also
 Art theft
 Art Loss Register

Notes

References
 Feliciano, Hector. (1997).   The Lost Museum: The Nazi Conspiracy to Steal the World's Greatest Works of Art. New York: Basic Books. ; 
 Houpt, Simon and Julian Radcliffe.  (2006).  Museum of the Missing: a History of Art Theft. New York: Sterling Publishing. ; 
 Nicholas, Lynn H. (1994).   The Rape of Europa: The Fate of Europe’s Treasures in the Third Reich and the Second World War. New York City: Vintage Books. ;

External links
 

Arts organizations established in 1998
Arts foundations based in the United States
Organizations based in New York City